Oak Technology was an American supplier of semiconductor chips for sound cards, graphics cards and optical storage devices such as CD-ROM, CD-RW and DVD.  It achieved success with optical storage  chips and its stock price increased substantially around the time of the tech bubble in 2000. After falling on hard times, in 2003 it was acquired by Zoran Corporation.

Oak Technology helped develop the ATAPI standard and provided the oakcdrom.sys CD-ROM driver that was ubiquitous on DOS-based systems in the mid-1990s.

History
Oak Technology, Inc. was founded in 1987 and was based in Sunnyvale, California, United States. During the late 1980s through the early 1990s, Oak was a supplier of PC graphics (SVGA) chipsets and PCBs. Oak Technology also supplied motherboard chipsets – a PS/2-compatible chipset and the Oaknote chipset for notebooks. Oak enjoyed modest success in the value segment (low-end) of the market, but without an effective Windows accelerator, ultimately failed to remain competitive.

In 1994, Sun Microsystems decided to change the name of their new language from Oak to Java because Oak was already trademarked by Oak Technology.

The company had a dominant position early on in the market for semiconductors for CD-ROM drives (around 1995) and later regained a prominent position in optical storage chips as the market transitioned to recordable/rewritable technology, resulting in substantial revenue growth and stock price appreciation at the height of the tech bubble in 2000.

However, the company could not maintain growth and the stock price declined substantially, including a drop by more than half on 19 June 2002.

It then acquired the pioneering digital TV chip company Teralogic at the end of 2002  whose technology would later contribute to Zoran's DTV chip development after Zoran acquired Oak Technology in 2003.

Graphics products

OTI037C - 8-bit VGA chipset, with up to 256KB of DRAM. Provided support for VGA, EGA & CGA display modes. Most are only able to do standard VGA modes.
(i.e. up to 320×200×256 and up to 640×480×16).

OTI057/067 - ISA SVGA chipsets. Supports up to 512KB of DRAM (usually 70/80 ns).

OTI077 - Enhanced version of the OTI067. Includes support for 1MB and up to 65 MHz dot clock. Capable of resolutions up to 1024×768×256 colors in non-interlaced mode, and up to 1280×1024×16 colors interlaced.

OTI087 - One of the first VLB chipsets available. Has a 16-bit external data path, and a 32-bit internal memory controller data path. It features an improved, local-bus compatible host interface controller with read and write caching capabilities similar to those implemented on Tseng ET4000AX graphics chips, along with register-based color expansion, 16-bit graphic latch and some other new (for its time) features.  Maximum BIOS resolutions are 1024x768x256 non-interlaced and 1280×1024×256 interlaced. Maximum dot clock is 80 MHz, but is usually coupled with the OTI068 clock generator capable of frequencies up to 78 MHz.  This chipset supports up to 2MB of 70/70R ns DRAM.

A modified version, OTI087X, added a hardware mouse cursor sprite. It was implemented on many Weitek P9000-based graphics boards as a companion VGA controller; unfortunately, on these boards the chip was typically configured with a narrow 8-bit data path to its own dedicated VGA memory, resulting in sub-par VGA mode performance.

Spitfire - OTI 64105/64107 - 64-bit DRAM chipset. Provides 2D/GUI acceleration features comparable to other 64-bit accelerators of its time.

Spitfire - OTI 64111 - 64-bit PCI/ISA 2D chipset with integrated 135 MHz RAMDAC. DRAM and EDO supported.

Eon - OTI 64217 - Supports EDO and SGRAM. PCI chipset, 64-bit memory bus.

Warp 5 - OTI 64317 
- During the late 1990s, Oak was developing their first and only 2D/3D graphics accelerator chip. Warp 5 was to be a tile-based deferred renderer (TBDR), similar to PowerVR's chipsets. In the same vein as the S3 ViRGE chip, the Warp 5 was pin-compatible with a 2D-only predecessor. The chip was never released because ATI acquired the technology. It was Oak's final mainstream graphics chip development effort.

This graphics processor was based on a region concept and had many similarities to Microsoft's Talisman architecture. The chip processed each region at a time and did on chip z-sorting and anti-aliasing. As a result, the chip did 24-bit floating point Z, sub-pixel anti-aliasing, order independent translucency, non-linear fogging and atmospheric effects and MIP-Mapping. Typically, such region based architectures are gated by the number of polygons that can be processed per region, but Oak claimed that there were no such limitations in the WARP 5.

The specifications included:
 50m pixels/sec (all features turned on)
 EDO and SGRAM Memory Supported - 8 MB
 On-chip Texture Cache
 2D GUI acceleration
 Video Scaling in Y
 VBI support Including Intercast
 220 MHz RAMDAC
 Resolutions to 1600 × 1200
 Direct3D and BRender APIs supported
 OS support Windows 95 and Windows NT
 Packaging - 256 pin BGA
 Pin Compatibility with OAK OTI-74217 EON 2D GUI accelerator

Optical storage products 

Oak sold millions of chip solutions for CD-ROM, CD-R/RW, DVD-ROM and DVD-ROM/CD-RW combo drives, primarily for the PC market.

References

External links
 Official website (archived)

1987 establishments in California
2003 disestablishments in California
American companies established in 1987
American companies disestablished in 2003
Companies based in Sunnyvale, California
Computer companies established in 1987
Computer companies disestablished in 2003
Defunct companies based in the San Francisco Bay Area
Defunct semiconductor companies of the United States
Graphics hardware companies
Technology companies based in the San Francisco Bay Area
Defunct computer companies of the United States
Defunct computer hardware companies